The Last Leg (known during its first series as The Last Leg with Adam Hills and in Australia as Adam Hills: The Last Leg) is a British comedy and late-night television talk/sketch show that originally ran alongside the 2012 Summer Paralympics every night following the main coverage on Channel 4. Anchored by Australian comedian Adam Hills and co-hosted by Josh Widdicombe and Alex Brooker, it gives a review of the week's events.

Featuring a mix of comedy, guests and Paralympics highlights, the show received strong reviews and regularly pulled in more than a million viewers each night of the Paralympic Games. It has since become a weekly show giving a humorous alternative look back at the week's events. Outside of the UK, the show is broadcast in Hills' native Australia by the ABC, albeit delayed until the Tuesday of the next week and with a different theme tune.

Format

Overview

The Last Leg is described by main presenter Adam Hills as "Three guys with four legs talking about the week", because Hills was born without a right foot and Brooker had his right leg amputated when he was a baby.

The original series, broadcast during the 2012 Paralympics, was a look back at each day's events during the competition, as well as a look at the news that week. Following on from the Paralympics, the series became weekly, and looks at political and other events in the news that week, as well as covering Paralympic matters. The show features guest interviews with Paralympians and celebrities.

Originally it was intended to be broadcast on More4 at midnight and was intended to feature Hills alone, hence the original title. However, after a run-through, Channel 4 saw more potential and put the show on at 10pm every day. During the pilot, which saw Hills alone as presenter and Widdicombe and Brooker merely as guests, producers decided to keep Brooker and Widdicombe as recurring co-presenters.

The series is broadcast live and encourages interaction with the viewers at home, holding polls via Twitter using hashtags. A recurring theme in the show is the use of the hashtag #isitok to highlight questions from Twitter users to be asked in the show. Initially it was for asking questions about disability that people felt awkward asking: the broadening of the show's remit is reflected in the questions asked in this stream.

The show originally was broadcast from the Riverside Studios in London. It would later move to the ITV London Studios on London's South Bank. From Series 14 it is now made in Studio TC1 at the BBC Studios in Television Centre, West London, which is operated and run by BBC Studioworks, though some 2020 episodes were made at Elstree Studios.

In late April 2020 it was announced that The Last Leg would be "Locked Down Under" during the coronavirus lockdown. Hills, Widdicombe and Brooker would be hosting the show from their homes in Melbourne, London and Huddersfield taking social distancing to the extreme and looking at the week's news in a comedic manner. Guests including Miriam Margolyes and Stephen Merchant were featured using video relay, and each episode ended with a song from The Horne Section. The show ran for five episodes from 8 May until 5 June and is available on All 4 after broadcast.

The show is currently playing at Television Centre, London.

Recurring segments
Recurring segments in the show include rants or attacks by Hills on certain people and organisations, which has since resulted in the coining of Hills' catchphrase: "Don't be a dick!" Another segment is "The Last 7 Days", in which Widdicombe looks at more comic news items that have occurred during the week, and Brooker's various attempts to qualify for the 2016 Summer Paralympics. Another is the "Bullshit Button", which was first used in a segment in which Brooker interviewed the then-Leader of the Liberal Democrats Nick Clegg to see if Clegg could persuade him to vote in the 2015 UK general election. Brooker would press a large red buzzer that played an audio recording of him saying the word "Bullshit" if he thought Clegg was lying during the interviews. Since then, the buzzer has been used in various situations whenever the show thinks someone is lying, and a second buzzer has been added which features Widdicombe saying: "That's true, actually" when someone says something that really is true.

After appearing on the show in 2017, comedian Armando Iannucci's voice has replaced Brooker's voice on the bullshit button. Since the replacement, four more buttons have been implemented, all four varying in levels: "cow chutney", "a shite in shining armour", "a turd the size of Disneyland Paris" and "Thomas the Wank Engine", the latter being the most often used. Most recently added is a button in which the sound is Brooker and Widdicombe exclaiming "Fuck off" in unison.

Dick of the Year

Since January 2014, The Last Leg has presented a mock prize to the "Dick of the Year", awarded for being the biggest dick over the previous year. The winner is voted on by the viewers using Twitter with the hashtag #dickoftheyear. The winner for 2013 was Russian president Vladimir Putin.

In January 2015, journalist Katie Hopkins received the most votes for 2014's "Dick of the Year" but Hills and the team making the show decided not give Hopkins the prize on the grounds that she would enjoy receiving it. Thus, the prize went to the person with the second-highest number of votes, UK Independence Party leader Nigel Farage.

The prize for 2015 was awarded to Health Secretary Jeremy Hunt, who won 80% of the vote in the final round of voting, beating Donald Trump into second place.

In the 2016 Christmas special, the prize was awarded to whole of the year 2016, defeating Donald Trump, Nigel Farage and David Cameron.

In 2017, it was announced that as well as "Dick of the Year", the people who have come second and third will be named "Ballbags of the Year". The nominations for 2017 were decided for by both public vote and a selection of wildcards chosen by the hosts of the show. The nominees are Theresa May, Kim Jong-un, Donald Trump, Adam's wildcard Bob Katter, Josh's wildcard Lewis Hamilton, and Alex's wildcard Philip Hammond. The result was Trump being declared the winner, with May second and Hamilton third. There was also a special award given to Harvey Weinstein, who was ruled out of running for the main award on the grounds that it is possible that Weinstein may take "Dick of the Year" as a compliment. Weinstein was given the "Steaming Turd" award for "lifetime achievement".

2018 followed a similar format to the previous year, with nominees selected by viewers and three from the hosts. The nominees were Theresa May, Jacob Rees-Mogg, Piers Morgan, Adam's wildcard Boris Johnson, Josh's wildcard Steve Smith, and Alex's wildcard Thanos. Rees-Mogg was announced as the winner, whilst Donald Trump was given a special award.

In 2019, comedy writer Graham Linehan was the runaway favourite nominee by viewers to be given the award, in light of controversial comments he had made on social media about transgender people. After Linehan expressed interest in winning the award, Hills and the team disqualified him from receiving the award under the precedent set by Hopkins in 2014. The public's nominees were Rees-Mogg, Johnson, and Prince Andrew, Adam's wildcard was the Chinese government, Alex's wildcard was Rebekah Vardy's Instagram account, Josh's nominee was the video assistant referee system. Johnson was declared the winner, with Rees-Mogg second and Prince Andrew third. Another poll also announced David Cameron as "Dick of the Decade".

In 2020, the prize was awarded 
to Dominic Cummings, beating Donald Trump, who finished second and Matt Hancock, who finished third, while other nominees included Arsenal F.C., Rudy Giuliani and 5G.

In 2022, Josh nominated the FIFA World Cup mascot Laʼeeb and Alex nominated Stranger Things antagonist Vecna. Other nominees included Elon Musk, Matt Hancock, Kanye West, and Liz Truss. Vladimir Putin was awarded the Steaming Turd Award for the Russian invasion of Ukraine.

Theme music
The theme music is Public Enemy's "Harder Than You Think", which became the show's permanent theme after initially serving as the title music to the whole of Channel 4's 2012 Summer Paralympics coverage.

Episodes

The first and ninth series were broadcast daily at the end of the day's Paralympics coverage on Channel 4.  The second series was broadcast each Friday, with the show moving to Wednesday nights for its third series, before reverting to Friday nights for the fourth and fifth series.

In October 2012 it was announced that the show would return for a Christmas special titled The Last Leg of the Year and a second series, which began broadcasting in January 2013. A third and fourth series followed in July 2013 and January 2014 (timed around the 2014 Winter Paralympics) respectively. A fifth series started broadcasting in August 2014, followed by a sixth series in January 2015 and a seventh in June 2015.

After the seventh series, a special 2-part series entitled The Last Leg Goes Down Under was broadcast on 29 January and 5 February 2016, and preceded the start of series 8 on 12 February. Starting from series 8, the show was given a brand new set.

On 25 March 2016, in a parody of the Boaty McBoatface internet poll controversy, the show released the #renametheLastLeg hashtag on Twitter live on the set to allow viewers to choose a new name for the show. The show brought the number of choices down to the four most popular ones and then they released a Twitter poll to change the name of the programme for next week's final episode of the series. The poll received a total of 3,731 votes with the highest scoring programme name being "Your Mum" with a 30% vote. The last episode of the series aired on 1 April 2016 and was called Your Mum. During one 2016 Summer Paralympics episode on 14 September 2016, host Adam Hills announced that the show was to be renamed again, this time in Paralympic athlete Libby Clegg's honour. The remainder of that show was called The Fast Clegg.

The show aired a two-hour special entitled Re-United Kingdom dedicated to MP Jo Cox on 16 June 2017 (the anniversary of her death). Featuring dozens of comedians and politicians, the show aimed to inspire the public to resolve animosity between people they had fallen out with. Politicians appeared in pre-recorded skits where they were stuck in a lift with another politician they disliked, and found common ground; some members of the public who had resolved arguments with each other were shown in a hot tub together.

Following the passing of Queen Elizabeth II on Thursday 8 September 2022, it was announced that there would be no new episode that Friday. This was not due to any regulations, but was rather a choice made by those involved with the show, with Adam Hills breaking the news on Twitter: "It just doesn’t feel right". The show the next week was a tribute to Her Majesty, without the typical broad coverage of the week's news.

Reception
Adam Hills was quoted as saying "If the Paralympics is covered well, it can change the way Jim Davidson looks at and treats people with disabilities". The Daily Mirror described The Last Leg as "a real success". Veteran TV pundit, the late Clive James said: "Taken as a whole, the Channel 4 coverage of the Paralympics was very good, but almost the best part of it was The Last Leg, the discussion show at the end of each day".

The programme provoked a discussion in the media about whether disability and comedy could work together on TV. The Independent described it as "a high risk venture" saying that Hills "reminds us frequently that he has a prosthetic leg, giving him licence to crack jokes that most of us wouldn't dream of." Frances Ryan, for The Guardian, described it as "often tasteless, sometimes awkward, always funny". Damon Rose for BBC News said that "Comedian Adam Hills' late night irreverent Para-chat show The Last Leg – a title reflecting Adam's lack of a segment of his lower limb – has taken mainstream viewers to dark and delightfully surprising places that only disability humour can go. And it has given a sense of permission for regular viewers to talk openly about things they may previously have shied away from".

Brooker's 2015 interview with Nick Clegg for the programme was described by political journalist Hugo Rifkind as "a model of how to talk normally to a politician – and make them talk normally back".

Awards and nominations

Footnotes

References

External links
 
 The Last Leg on Channel 4
 
 

2010s British satirical television series
2010s British television talk shows
2012 British television series debuts
2012 Summer Paralympics
2020s British satirical television series
2020s British television talk shows
British sports television series
Channel 4 comedy
English-language television shows
Television series impacted by the COVID-19 pandemic
Television shows about disability
Television shows shot at Elstree Film Studios